The 68th Assembly District of Wisconsin is one of 99 districts in the Wisconsin State Assembly.  Located in Northwestern Wisconsin, the district comprises the eastern half of Eau Claire County and about half of Clark County, as well as part of southeast Chippewa County.  The district includes the cities of Altoona, Augusta, Greenwood, Osseo, Owen, Stanley, and Thorp. The district is represented by Republican  Karen Hurd, since January 2023.

The 68th Assembly district is located within Wisconsin's 23rd Senate district, along with the 67th and 69th Assembly districts.

History
The district was created in the 1972 redistricting act (1971 Wisc. Act 304) which first established the numbered district system, replacing the previous system which allocated districts to specific counties.  The 68th district was drawn mostly in line with the former Eau Claire County 1st district (most of the city of Eau Claire), but added all of the remaining precincts of the city of Eau Claire.  The last representative of the Eau Claire County 1st district, Joseph Looby, went on to win the first election to represent the 68th Assembly district.

The district boundaries have shifted over the various redistricting schemes since 1983, though the district had remained anchored on the city of Eau Claire until the controversial 2011 redistricting plan (2011 Wisc. Act 43) which divided the city between the 68th and 91st Assembly districts, and added vast stretches of Clark County and parts of Jackson and Trempealeau counties to the 68th district.  As of the 2022 redistricting, barely any of the city of Eau Claire remains in this district.

List of past representatives

Electoral history

References 

Wisconsin State Assembly districts
Chippewa County, Wisconsin
Clark County, Wisconsin
Eau Claire County, Wisconsin
Jackson County, Wisconsin
Trempealeau County, Wisconsin